A galaxy cluster, or a cluster of galaxies, is a structure that consists of anywhere from hundreds to thousands of galaxies that are bound together by gravity,  with typical masses ranging from 1014 to 1015 solar masses. They are the second-largest known gravitationally bound structures in the universe after galaxy filaments and were believed to be the largest known structures in the universe until the 1980s, when superclusters were discovered. One of the key features of clusters is the intracluster medium (ICM). The ICM consists of heated gas between the galaxies and has a peak temperature between 2–15 keV that is dependent on the total mass of the cluster. Galaxy clusters should not be confused with galactic clusters (also known as open clusters), which are star clusters within galaxies, or with globular clusters, which typically orbit galaxies. Small aggregates of galaxies are referred to as galaxy groups rather than clusters of galaxies. The galaxy groups and clusters can themselves cluster together to form superclusters.

Notable galaxy clusters in the relatively nearby Universe include the Virgo Cluster, Fornax Cluster, Hercules Cluster, and the Coma Cluster. A very large aggregation of galaxies known as the Great Attractor, dominated by the Norma Cluster, is massive enough to affect the local expansion of the Universe. Notable galaxy clusters in the distant, high-redshift Universe include SPT-CL J0546-5345 and SPT-CL J2106-5844, the most massive galaxy clusters found in the early Universe. In the last few decades, they are also found to be relevant sites of particle acceleration, a feature that has been discovered by observing non-thermal diffuse radio emissions, such as radio halos and radio relics. Using the Chandra X-ray Observatory, structures such as cold fronts and shock waves have also been found in many galaxy clusters.

Basic properties

Galaxy clusters typically have the following properties:
 They contain 100 to 1,000 galaxies, hot X-ray emitting gas and large amounts of dark matter. Details are described in the "Composition" section.
 The distribution of the three components is approximately the same in the cluster.
 They have total masses of 1014 to 1015 solar masses.
 They typically have a diameter from 1 to 5 Mpc (see 1023 m for distance comparisons).
 The spread of velocities for the individual galaxies is about 800–1000 km/s.

Composition
There are three main components of a galaxy cluster. They are tabulated below:

Classification

Galaxy clusters are categorized as type I, II, or III based on morphology.

Galaxy clusters as measuring instruments

Gravitational redshift 
Galaxy clusters have been used by Radek Wojtak from the Niels Bohr Institute at the University of Copenhagen to test predictions of general relativity: energy loss from light escaping a gravitational field. Photons emitted from the center of a galaxy cluster should lose more energy than photons coming from the edge of the cluster because gravity is stronger in the center. Light emitted from the center of a cluster has a longer wavelength than light coming from the edge. This effect is known as gravitational redshift. Using the data collected from 8000 galaxy clusters, Wojtak was able to study the properties of gravitational redshift for the distribution of galaxies in clusters. He found that the light from the clusters was redshifted in proportion to the distance from the center of the cluster as predicted by general relativity. The result also strongly supports the Lambda-Cold Dark Matter model of the Universe, according to which most of the cosmos is made up of Dark Matter that does not interact with matter.

Gravitational lensing 
Galaxy clusters are also used for their strong gravitational potential as gravitational lenses to boost the reach of their telescopes. The gravitational distortion of space-time occurs near massive galaxy clusters and bends the path of photons to create a cosmic magnifying glass. This can be done with photons of any wavelength from the optical to the X-ray band. The latter is more difficult, because galaxy clusters emit a lot of X-rays. However, X-ray emission may still be detected when combining X-ray data to optical data. One particular case is the use of the Phoenix galaxy cluster to observe a dwarf galaxy in its early high energy stages of star formation.

List

Gallery

Images

Videos

See also

 Abell catalogue
 Intracluster medium
 List of Abell clusters

References

 Cluster
Articles containing video clips